William Brodie (13 February 1878 – 11 July 1922) was a cricketer. He played in one first-class match for British Guiana in 1901/02.

See also
 List of Guyanese representative cricketers

References

External links
 

1878 births
1922 deaths
Cricketers from British Guiana